Sanʽani Arabic is an Arabic dialect spoken in north of Yemen in the city of Sana'a.

Phonology 
The Sanaani dialect is distinguished among Yemeni dialects by its use of the  sound in the place of the  used in Modern Standard Arabic.

Consonants

Vowels 

 within emphatic environments can be heard as back .

Grammar 
Along with these phonological similarities to other dialects, Sanʽani Arabic also has several unique features.  It uses the classical mā in the meaning of "what", as well as in negations. Unlike the classical usage, this mā is used without distinction in verbal and nominal sentences alike.  Sanʽani Arabic represents the future aspect with a complex array of prefixes, depending on the person of the verb.  For first-person verbs the prefix (ša-) or (‘ad) is used.  The derivation of (ša-) is apparently related to the classical (sa-), and (‘ad) is likely an abbreviation of (ba‘d), meaning "after".  For all other persons in Sanʽa proper the simple prefix (‘a-) is used, although many of the villages around Sanʽa extend the use of (ša-) for all persons.

Syntax 
Sanʽani syntax differs from other Arabic dialects in a number of ways.  It is one of few remaining Arabic dialects to retain the mā af‘al exclamatory sentence type with the meaning "how (adjective)".  For instance, mā ajmal, is used to mean "how beautiful", from the adjective jamīl, meaning "beautiful"; a construction it shares with Libyan Arabic and Levantine Arabic.

Vocabulary 
The Sanʽani vocabulary is also very distinct and conservative.  The classical verb sāra, yasīr is retained with the meaning of "to go" (similar to Moroccan).  Shalla, yashill is used to mean "to take/get".

As an example of its distinctiveness, during an appearance of the would-be parliament speaker of Yemen, Abdullah Alahmar, on Al-Jazeera TV some years ago, viewers and the TV host needed a translation of his Yemeni dialect into Standard Arabic in order to understand what he said.

Loanwords

See also
 Varieties of Arabic
 Yemeni Arabic

References

Arabic languages